Stan Jones (26 December 1914 – 18 May 2006) was a British long-distance runner. He competed in the marathon at the 1948 Summer Olympics.

References

1914 births
2006 deaths
Athletes (track and field) at the 1948 Summer Olympics
British male long-distance runners
British male marathon runners
Olympic athletes of Great Britain
Place of birth missing